Nadezhda Ryabets (born 14 September 2000 in Vozvyshenka, North Kazakhstan, Kazakhstan) is a Kazakhstani boxer. In June 2020, she became the only Kazakhstani female boxer to qualify for the Tokyo summer Olympics, in the middleweight category.

Nadezhda Ryabets started boxing in 2010. In 2015, she earned the gold medal at the Taipei 2015 AIBA Women's Junior World Boxing Championships and won the ASBC Asian Youth Boxing Championships in Bangkok in 2018.

References

External links
 
 Nadezhda Ryabets at BoxRec

Living people
2000 births
People from Kostanay
Kazakhstani people of Russian descent
Kazakhstani women boxers
Middleweight boxers
Olympic boxers of Kazakhstan
Boxers at the 2020 Summer Olympics
Boxers at the 2018 Summer Youth Olympics
Medalists at the 2018 Summer Youth Olympics
21st-century Kazakhstani women